T&M may refer to:

 The British waterway Trent and Mersey Canal
 Time & Material: Time and materials
 Former British manufacturer of prefabricated buildings Teesdale and Metcalf

See also

 For TM (without the "&") see TM (disambiguation)